One Voice is the first Japanese album by South Korean singer Kyuhyun. It was released on February 8, 2017 through Avex Trax. The album reached number 1 on Oricon′s daily chart and it ranked number 1 on Oricon weekly album chart in less than a week. With this album, Kyuhyun became the first solo foreign male artist from a group to top the chart.

Track listing

References

2017 albums
Japanese-language albums
Cho Kyuhyun albums